The 2016 Miami Open presented by Itaú (also known as 2016 Miami Masters) was a professional men and women's tennis tournament being played on outdoor hard courts. It was the 32nd edition of the Miami Open, and was part of the Masters 1000 category on the 2016 ATP World Tour, and of the Premier Mandatory category on the 2016 WTA Tour. All men and women's events took place at the Tennis Center at Crandon Park in Key Biscayne, Florida, United States, from March 21 through April 3, 2016.

Points and prize money

Point distribution

 Players with byes receive first round points.

Prize money

ATP singles main-draw entrants

Seeds 
The following are the seeded players. Rankings and seedings are based on ATP rankings as of March 21, 2016.

† The player used an exemption to skip the tournament in 2015. Accordingly, points for his 18th best result are deducted instead.
‡ The player did not qualify for the tournament in 2015. Accordingly, points for his 18th best result are deducted instead.

Other entrants
The following players received wildcards into the singles main draw:
  Roberto Carballés Baena 
  Nicolás Jarry
  Michael Mmoh
  Andrey Rublev
  Elias Ymer

The following players received entry using a protected ranking into the main draw:
  Brian Baker
  Juan Martín del Potro

The following players received entry from the qualifying draw:
  Benjamin Becker
  Bjorn Fratangelo
  Taylor Fritz
  Alejandro González
  Marcel Granollers
  Pierre-Hugues Herbert
  Tatsuma Ito
  Mikhail Kukushkin
  Yoshihito Nishioka
  Dennis Novikov
  Tommy Paul
  Tim Smyczek

The following players received entry as lucky losers:
  Jared Donaldson
  Rogério Dutra Silva
  Horacio Zeballos

Withdrawals
Before the tournament
  Nicolás Almagro → replaced by  Mikhail Youzhny
  Kevin Anderson → replaced by  Lucas Pouille
  Pablo Andújar → replaced by  Evgeny Donskoy
  Roger Federer (gastroenteritis) → replaced by  Horacio Zeballos
  Fabio Fognini → replaced by  Illya Marchenko
  Robin Haase (knee injury) → replaced by  Jared Donaldson
  Andreas Haider-Maurer → replaced by  Dušan Lajović
  Ivo Karlović → replaced by  Ernests Gulbis
  Martin Kližan (foot injury) → replaced by  Rogério Dutra Silva
  Philipp Kohlschreiber →replaced by  Rajeev Ram
  Paolo Lorenzi → replaced by  Damir Džumhur
  Daniel Muñoz de la Nava → replaced by  Diego Schwartzman
  Tommy Robredo → replaced by  Sam Groth
  Janko Tipsarević → replaced by  Kyle Edmund
  Bernard Tomic → replaced by  Ivan Dodig

During the tournament
  Rajeev Ram (illness)

Retirements
  Aljaž Bedene (right wrist injury)
  Thomaz Bellucci (dehydration)
  Ivan Dodig (back injury)
  Rafael Nadal (illness)
  Sergiy Stakhovsky (back injury)

ATP doubles main-draw entrants

Seeds

1 Rankings as of March 21, 2016.

Other entrants
The following pairs received wildcards into the doubles main draw:
  Eric Butorac /  Scott Lipsky
  Omar Jasika /  John-Patrick Smith

The following pair received entry as alternates:
  Thomaz Bellucci /  André Sá
  Leonardo Mayer /  João Sousa

Withdrawals
Before the tournament
  Juan Martín del Potro (illness)
  David Goffin (migraine)

During the tournament
  Roberto Bautista Agut (dehydration)
  Rafael Nadal (illness)

WTA singles main-draw entrants

Seeds
The following are the seeded players. Seedings are based on WTA rankings as of March 7, 2016. Rankings and points before are as of March 21, 2016.

† The player did not qualify for the tournament in 2015. Accordingly, points for her 16th best result are deducted instead.

Other entrants
The following players received wildcards into the singles main draw:
  Paula Badosa Gibert 
  Catherine Bellis
  Nicole Gibbs 
  Beatriz Haddad Maia
  Naomi Osaka
  Laura Robson
  Heather Watson
  Sofya Zhuk

The following players received entry using a protected ranking into the main draw:
  Petra Cetkovská
  Vania King
  Peng Shuai
  Galina Voskoboeva

The following players received entry from the qualifying draw:
  Kiki Bertens 
  Jana Čepelová
  Samantha Crawford
  Lourdes Domínguez Lino
  Magda Linette
  Pauline Parmentier
  Kristýna Plíšková
  Maria Sakkari
  Aliaksandra Sasnovich
  Francesca Schiavone
  Anna Tatishvili
  Elena Vesnina

Withdrawals
Before the tournament
  Mona Barthel →replaced by  Carina Witthöft
  Varvara Lepchenko →replaced by  Irina Falconi
  Maria Sharapova (provisional suspension) →replaced by  Bethanie Mattek-Sands

Retirements
  Belinda Bencic (low back injury)
  Kiki Bertens
  Jelena Janković (right shoulder injury)

WTA doubles main-draw entrants

Seeds 

1 Rankings as of March 7, 2016.

Other entrants
The following pairs received wildcards into the doubles main draw:
  Simona Halep /  Daniela Hantuchová
  Madison Keys /  Sloane Stephens
  Svetlana Kuznetsova /  Anastasia Pavlyuchenkova
  Monica Puig /  Heather Watson

The following pair received entry as alternates:
  Belinda Bencic /  Stephanie Vogt

Withdrawals
Before the tournament
  Simona Halep

Champions

Men's singles

  Novak Djokovic def.  Kei Nishikori, 6–3, 6–3

Women's singles

  Victoria Azarenka def.  Svetlana Kuznetsova, 6–3, 6–2

Men's doubles

 Pierre-Hugues Herbert /  Nicolas Mahut def.  Raven Klaasen /  Rajeev Ram, 5–7, 6–1, [10–7]

Women's doubles

  Bethanie Mattek-Sands /  Lucie Šafářová def.  Tímea Babos /  Yaroslava Shvedova, 6–3, 6–4

References

External links